Hatfield and Stainforth railway station serves the towns of Hatfield and Stainforth in South Yorkshire, England.

The original station, known until the 1990s as "Stainforth and Hatfield" and was built in 1866 as a replacement for the South Yorkshire Railway's Stainforth when their line was brought to its present alignment. The station was renamed Hatfield and Stainforth in the 1990s when it was considered that Hatfield was the larger of the two and had the larger population.

The Doncaster Core Strategy includes support for "refurbishment of the railway station and the creation of a rail/bus/park and ride interchange".

Facilities
The station is unstaffed but has a ticket machine.  There are no substantial buildings remaining on the platforms other than standard waiting shelters and the fully accessible footbridge linking them to the station entrance and car park.  The former station building adjacent to the entrance is still standing - the single customer help point is located on one of its outer walls. Train running information is provided by digital information screens and timetable posters.

Service
The majority of services at Hatfield and Stainforth are operated by Northern Trains.

The typical off-peak service in trains per hour is:
 2 tph to 
 1 tph to Hull via 
 1 tph to 

This service runs towards Liverpool in the early morning and towards Cleethorpes in the late evening.

On Sundays, there is an hourly service between Doncaster and Hull with no service to Scunthorpe.

There is also a freight only line to the Wakefield Line to South Elmsall, Wakefield and Leeds, with additional goods lines passing behind both platforms.

In February 2013 the line northeast of Hatfield and Stainforth station towards Thorne was blocked by the Hatfield Colliery landslip, with all services over the section halted. The line reopened in July 2013.

References

External links

Railway stations in Doncaster
DfT Category F1 stations
Former Great Central Railway stations
Railway stations in Great Britain opened in 1866
Northern franchise railway stations
1866 establishments in England
Railway stations served by TransPennine Express